One Oasis is a residential complex development in Cotai, South of Macau and Hengqin Island of Zhuhai. The community facilities in the development encompass a clubhouse, a retail centre, a 6-star hotel, cultural and entertainment conventions. Phase 1 of One Oasis comprises 5 low-density residential towers providing 870 units. The construction of Phase 1 was scheduled to be completed in the 2nd quarter of 2013. Special units contain duplexes and sky houses with a minimum area of 3,000 square feet.

Location
One Oasis is situated in Cotai which embraces the world-famous casino-cum-resorts including the Venetian Macau and City of Dreams. A slew of new integrated resorts and hotels such as Galaxy Resort, Sheraton Hotel, Shangri-La Hotel, St. Regis Hotel Trader Hotel are earmarked to open soon.

One Oasis borders an international-standard Caesars Golf Macao developed by the US-based Harrahs Group and also one of the largest country parks in Macau. In neighbouring Hengqin, billions of dollars worth of investment led by the Central Government of China are being funnelled into a number of developments including the University of Macau Hengqin Campus and the largest ocean themed park and resort in Asia, the new exhibition and creative business zone. The construction of the developments has commenced on Hengqin Island and is due for completion within two or three years.

Clubhouse
A central clubhouse namely Club Oasis is planned to be built inside a southern European garden. Club Oasis brings over 100 clubhouse facilities and services, including indoor and outdoor swimming pools, banquet rooms, red wine tasting, billiard rooms, spa and massage services.

Transportation network
One Oasis possesses a comprehensive transportation network spanning Macau Light Transit System, Lotus Bridge, HK-Zhuhai-Macau Bridge, the underwater tunnel linking the University of Macau Hengqin Campus, Guangzhou-Zhuhai Intercity Railway and Beijing-HK-Macau Highway. The network enables effortless travel around Macau, Hong Kong, Mainland China and the world in conjunction with shuttle bus services.

Developers and Consultant teams

One Oasis’ developers consists of Hong Kong-listed companies as well as developers, builders and international investment institutions, including ITC Properties Group Limited, Linkeast Investments Limited, Nan Fung Group, ARCH Capital Management and Success Universe Group.

One Oasis has appointed a team of consultants to undertake master planning, architecture, design and property management. The design architect, US-based Moore Ruble Yudell (MRY), had track records in Potatisakern and Tango projects in Sweden, Santa Monica Village in California, USA and the Chun Sen Bi An Master Plan & Housing in Chongqing, China. MRY’s projects have been recognized through over 200 local and international awards. The project architect of One Oasis, Archiplus International Limited has participated in Ponte 16 Casino & Sofitel Hotel. AECOM, a fortune 500 company, is One Oasis’ landscape architect. Tokyo Midtown and the Venetian Macau Resort Hotel are its masterpieces. Savills is appointed as property management consultant for the development.

References

External links 
  One Oasis Official Site
  Hengqin Island
 Macau International Airport
 ITC Properties Group Limited
  Nan Fung Group
 Arch Capital Management
 Success Universe Group

Skyscrapers in Macau
Macau
Residential skyscrapers in China